Abhijit Deshmukh (born 24 December 1970) is an Indian cricket umpire. He has stood in matches in the Ranji Trophy tournament. In March 2019, he was one of the two on-field umpires for the first Women's Twenty20 International (WT20I) between India and England at the Barsapara Stadium in Guwahati.

References

External links
 

1970 births
Living people
Indian cricket umpires
People from Nagpur